Andreas Zünd (born 8 February 1957, St. Gallen), is a Swiss jurist and current judge at the European Court of Human Rights.

Education 
He studied law at the University of Bern from where he obtained a licentiate in 1982 and doctorate in 1986.

Professional career 
Besides he acted as the substitute judge for the high court in Argovia between 1987 and 2002 before he assumed as an ordinary Judge at the same court from 2002 to 2004. Concordantly he also acted as a part-time judge at the Federal Court of Switzerland from 1996 to 2004 before he was elected a Federal Judge in Dezember 2003 as the successor of Martin Schubarth.

Federal Judge of Switzerland 
As a Swiss Federal Judge he was involved in several notable cases of public law like the transfer of date from thousands of UBS bank account holders to the French authorities. In Switzerland judges are members of a political party for which Switzerland was often criticized by the Council of Europe. He is a member of the left-wing Social Democratic Party of Switzerland (SP).

Judge at the European Court of Human Rights 
In January 2021 he was elected a Judge of the European Court of Human Rights by the Parliamentary Assembly of the Council of Europe(PACE). He is the sixth judge representing Switzerland at the ECHR and only the second Swiss Federal judge to assumed as a judge at the ECHR.

References    

Living people
1954 births
Swiss jurists
Swiss judges of international courts and tribunals
21st-century Swiss judges
People from St. Gallen (city)